Mihailović is a Serbian surname, a patronymic derived from the masculine name Mihailo (Michael). There is also the spelling variant Mihajlović. It may refer to:

Doksim Mihailović (1883–1912), military commander
Dragoslav Mihailović (born 1930), writer
Draža Mihailović (1893–1946), military leader of Yugoslav resistance movement
Đorđe Mihailović (born 1928), cemetery keeper
Konstantin Mihailović (1435–1501), soldier and memoirist
Milorad Bata Mihailović (1923–2011), painter
Radomir Mihailović (born 1950), guitarist
Stevča Mihailović (1804–1888), politician
Trifun Mihailović (born 1947), footballer
Vladimir Mihailović (born 1990), basketball player
Vojislav Mihailović (born 1951), politician
Zoran Mihailović (born 1996), footballer

See also
Mihajlović

Serbian surnames
Patronymic surnames
Surnames from given names
ru:Михаилович